Big Brother Africa 3 is the third series of the Big Brother Africa reality television show produced by Endemol. The season began airing on 24 August 2008 and run 91 days ending 23 November 2008.

As with the previous series, the show involves 12 countries within Africa (Angola, Botswana, Ghana, Kenya, Malawi, Namibia, Nigeria, South Africa, Tanzania, Uganda, Zambia & Zimbabwe) each producing a contestant living in an isolated house in Johanneburg, South Africa, while trying to avoid being evicted by viewers and ultimately winning a large cash prize at the end of the show. The show is filmed in a house at Sasani Studios in Lyndhurst, Johannesburg. This season marks the closest vote in the history of the Big Brother series in Africa.

Production

The House
Architecturally, the House in this series of Big Brother was hardly unchanged from the previous one. The House was, however, completely revamped in the inside with brand new decor and an edgier look. The kitchen together with the dining area and the lounge had a Garden of Eden theme with artificial grass on the floor and green plants crawling on the surrounding walls. The bathroom, particularly the shower, had clocks all over the walls to create a feeling of paranoia - the clocks also did not work. The bedrooms were also switched from the previous season, meaning the girls had to sleep in the bedroom closer to the kitchen whilst the boys had to sleep in the bedroom closer to the bathroom. The House also boasted a large backyard, with the jacuzzi being replaced by an even bigger irregular-shaped pool, a Diary Room where the Housemates were strongly encouraged to voice their true opinions and feelings, and a Store Room where most of the Housemates' belongings were kept.

Nominations
Each week housemates nominate two other housemates for eviction in the Diary Room and must give justified and clear reasons. The Head of House may be nominated for eviction as well. After the nominees are revealed to the House, the current Head of House can save a nominee for eviction including themselves if they are nominated and replace the saved nominee with another nominee. While this is revealed to the viewers, the House does not know of the decision until eviction night Sunday.

Voting
Each eviction week viewers in the 12 participating countries vote to eliminate a housemate they do not like. The majority for each country will be counted as a vote. In addition to the 12 participating countries, all other countries not participating in the show can still vote for who they would like to eliminate. The "other countries" counts for the 13th vote.

Head of House
The Head of House (or HOH) is a position in the house that gives one housemate each week special privileges over the other Housemates. It is a power similar to both the Head of Household and the Power of Veto used in the American, Brazilian and British version of Big Brother. During nominations, the Head of House can be nominated for eviction by their fellow housemates. Then the Head of House can choose to save a nominee or save themselves from eviction and nominate a new housemate for eviction. While the decision is released to the public, the House will not know of the decision until Sunday, eviction night.

Housemates

Hazel
Hazel Warren is the 25-year-old representative from Malawi. Hazel finished in second place on 23 November 2008 (Day 91) after a close vote result between her and Ricco in which she received 38.60% of the vote to Ricco received 38.80%. Early on in her stay Hazel became known as the house cook among her housemates even though according to a few of her housemates she had only mediocre cooking skills. Throughout her stay in the house, Hazel became close with South African housemate Thami. She managed to avoid being nominated early on in the series (with exception of the fourth round of nominations) but towards the end of her stay in the Big Brother house, she was nominated three times in a row, during one of which she was up against Thami. Following Thami's eviction, Hazel found herself outnumbered three-to-one and was nominated against Tawana in the final eviction of the season. To both her and Tawana's surprise, Hazel survived.

Latoya
Latoya Lyakurwa is the 21-year-old from Tanzania where she works as a secretary.  She became the first evictee of Big Brother Africa 3 on 21 September 2008 (Day 28). Latoya's stay in the Big Brother house was highlighted by her alternating of two male companions. She shared a bed with Ricco at night but was constantly seen attaching herself to Morris during the day. This led several housemates to remark how Latoya was "playing" both of them. Latoya stated several times, during a private conversation with Munya and while in the rubbish dump for a week with Tawana, that she did not care about how the guys were feeling as she was just having fun.

Lucille
Lucille Naobes is the 21-year-old representative from Namibia. She became the second evictee of the show on 28 September 2008 (Day 35). Lucille was not initially nominated by the housemates for eviction but ended up being placed for nomination by Takondwa who had been nominated but had Head of House privileges for that week, which meant he could replace himself with any of the housemates. The reason Takondwa gave was that he felt Lucille was the least likely housemate to get voted out by the viewers. Lucille stated in the post-eviction interview that she thought Takondwa was still suspecting her of stealing his cigarettes and that is the real reason he replaced himself with her. A highlight of the eviction was that Nigerian housemate Uti had a violent outburst when he learned that Lucille was to be evicted.

Mimi
Wihelmina (Mimi) Abu-Andani is the 27-year-old representative from Ghana. She became the fifth evictee Big Brother 3 Africa on 19 October 2008 (Day 56). She was notorious for her gossiping sessions with Ricco and Lucille. Towards the end of her stay, Mimi was seen as overconfident, sometimes even cocky, by some of the viewers, as she stated many times that Africa would not vote her out.

Morris

Morris Mugisha is the 29-year-old representative from Uganda. He became the seventh evictee of Big Brother Africa 3 on 2 November 2008 (Day 70).

Munya

Munyaradzi (Munya) Chidzonga is the 22-year-old representative from Zimbabwe. Munya finished in third place on 23 November 2008 (Day 91). During his stay in the Big Brother house, Munya became romantically close with Botswana housemate Tawana.  Midway through his stay Munya took part in a Big Brother swap with Finnish housemate Johan. While in Finland Munya grew close to Finnish housemate Cheryll. Towards the end of his stay, he became friends with Angolan housemate Ricco.

Munya competed as a contestant in Big Brother Africa 5: All-Stars in which he lasted 91 days and was runner-up in the final.  He spent a combined 182 days in the Big Brother house (record second-highest days spent in the Big Brother Africa house).

Ricco
Ricardo (Ricco) Venancio is the 21-year-old representative from Angola. Ricco was declared the winner of Big Brother 3 Africa on 23 November 2008 (Day 91) after a close vote result between him and Hazel in which he received 38.80% to Hazel received 38.60%. Early on his stay in the house, Ricco found himself attracted to Tanzanian housemate Latoya. Towards the end of his stay, he found himself attracted to Botswana housemate Tawana, so much so that a night of drinking may or may not have led the two become closer. During his stay in the house, Ricco also became friends with Munya as well as Mimi and Lucille.

Sheila
Sheila Kwamboka is a 23-year-old representative from Kenya. She became the fourth evictee of Big Brother 3 Africa on 12 October 2008 (Day 49). She is a former beauty queen under the Kenyan Miss tourism title but she was dethroned due to controversies.  Sheila will be remembered for her talkative attitude and entertaining personality as well as her relationship with Takondwa during her stay in the house and her bisexuality.

In 2010 Sheila competed as a contestant on Big Brother Africa 5: All-Stars and lasted until the final on Day 91.  She has spent a total of 140 days in the Big Brother house.

Takondwa
Takondwa Nkonjera is the 25-year-old representative from Zambia. He became the sixth evictee of Big Brother 3 Africa on 26 October 2008 (Day 63). While in the house Takondwa started a relationship with fellow housemate Sheila from Kenya. Takondwa also made many enemies in the house when during the second round of nominations he, as HOH, chose to replace himself who was already up for nomination with his friend and fellow housemate Lucille. Also while in the house, Takondwa was up for nomination five times but was saved three of the times, twice by himself and once by fellow housemate Morris.

Tawana
Tawana Lebale is the 31-year-old representative from Botswana. She became the ninth and final evictee of the season on 16 November 2008 (Day 84). Early on in her stay, Tawana was fake evicted to the Big Brother dump along with Tanzanian housemate Latoya after which she and Latoya were both up for eviction. Tawana managed to survive the first eviction and returned to the house. During the rest of her stay in the Big Brother Africa house, Tawana became romantically close with fellow housemates Ricco and Munya, but stated that she only felt feelings for Munya. She was not initially nominated for eviction in round nine of nominations but was selected by Munya to replace Ricco as the second nominee in the final eviction. Tawana caused a lot of controversy amongst fans of the reality show due to her sexual escapades with various housemates.

Thami 
Thamsanqa (Thami) Prusent is the 26-year-old representative from South Africa. He was nicknamed Hyena by the fans for his infectious laugh and witty sense of humour. Thami also played the biggest prank on the show; in response to provocation, he threw all the meat and cigarettes over the wall. Hungry and without cigarettes the house was in chaos as he intended. Thami also climbed over the wall of the house; this was a first in any edition of Big Brother globally. He was lucky not to be kicked off the show. He became the eighth evictee from Big Brother 3 Africa on 9 November 2008 (Day 77). While in the house Thami started a relationship with fellow housemate Hazel from Malawi. Towards the end of the season, both Thami and Hazel were nominated many times and in the eighth round of nominations, they found themselves nominated against each other. The two continued their relationship after the show.

Uti
Uti Nwachukwu is the 25-year-old representative from Nigeria. He became the third evictee of Big Brother Africa 3 house on 5 October 2008 (Day 42). During his stay Uti was known for often teasing his fellow housemates; the most entertaining was his continuous battles with Thami. During Namibian housemate, Lucille's eviction Uti had a violent outburst upon learning that she had been evicted.

In 2010 Uti competed as a contestant in Big Brother Africa 5: All-Stars in which he lasted 91 days and ultimately won by defeating Munya is a final vote of 8 to 7.  He has spent a combined total of 133 days in the Big Brother house.

Swap with the Big Brother Finland house 
Johan, from Finnish Big Brother season 4 swapped with Munya on the week 9.

Hero & Zero Vote 
On Day 2, Housemates were asked to name 2 housemates one of which they would consider their "Hero" the person they would most like to live with for the full 91 days and one that they would consider a "Zero" the person that they thought deserved to leave the house as soon as possible. The first name they gave was that of their "hero" and the second name they gave was that of their "zero". These nominations did not count and no one was put up for the public vote.

Nominations Table
A record of the nominations cast, stored in a nominations table, shows how each Housemate nominated other Housemates throughout his or her time in the house. The Head of House can choose to save a nominated Housemate each week and nominate another Housemate to face the public vote. Twists to the normal nominations process are noted, such as immunity from nomination and eviction (referred to as "exempt").

Notes

References

External links 
 Big Brother Africa 3 at M-Net
 Big Brother Africa 3 official fan site

2008 South African television seasons
03